Janice Cowan (born in Hampshire, England) is a writer based in Victoria, British Columbia, Canada. She was previously a spy for the Canadian government during a diplomatic posting in the Soviet Union prior to its dissolution.

Bibliography
 2006: A Spy's Wife. Lorimer 
 1991: Black Forest Secret, Borealis 
 1987: Mystery on the Miramichi, Borealis 
 1983: Secret of Ivy Lea, Borealis 
 1981: Mystery of Castle Hotel, Borealis 
 1977: Maple Island Mystery, Borealis

External links
 Formac: Janice Cowan 
 Writers' Union of Canada: Janice Cowan profile
 
 
  Interview on Sounds Like Canada, CBC Radio One.

Living people
Year of birth missing (living people)
British emigrants to Canada
Canadian non-fiction writers
Canadian women novelists
20th-century Canadian novelists
21st-century Canadian novelists
20th-century Canadian women writers
21st-century Canadian women writers
Writers from Victoria, British Columbia
Canadian women non-fiction writers